Oxychilus oglasicola is a species of small air-breathing land snail, a terrestrial pulmonate gastropod mollusk in the family Oxychilidae, a family of glass snails.

This species is endemic to Italy, and is threatened by habitat loss.

References

Oxychilus
Molluscs of Europe
Endemic fauna of Italy
Gastropods described in 1968
Taxonomy articles created by Polbot